Arnold Duncan McNair, 1st Baron McNair  (4 March 1885 – 22 May 1975) was a British jurist and judge of the International Court of Justice and later the first president of the European Court of Human Rights.

Early life and education
McNair was born in Highbury Fields, London. The eldest son of John McNair and Jeannie Ballantyne; his mother was a teacher and his father a member of Lloyd's. McNair was educated at Aldenham School. He left school at 17 to join his sick uncle who was a solicitor; he took his solicitor exams and qualified as a solicitor in 1906. After four years, his uncle's health improved and McNair applied to the University of Cambridge. He was accepted and won a classical scholarship for Gonville and Caius College, Cambridge; he took the law tripos in 1907 and 1908. While at Cambridge, he developed a close relationship with W. W. Buckland. He achieved a double first in both parts of the law tripos. From Cambridge, he took an LLB in 1909, an LLM in 1913, an MA in 1919 and an LLD in 1925. From 1907 to 1908 he was Secretary of Cambridge University Liberal Club, and in 1909 he was President of the Cambridge Union.

Career 
McNair moved to London to practise as a solicitor. However, Buckland went to London to offer McNair a lectureship and fellowship at Caius College in 1912, which was accepted. He later became senior tutor. During the First World War, he worked under the coal controller, serving as secretary to the Sankey Commission in 1919.

In 1917, he was called to the bar at Gray's Inn.  He was reader in international law at the University of London from 1926 to 1927. He was appointed Tagore Professor at the University of Calcutta in 1931. In 1935 he was appointed Whewell Professor of International Law at Cambridge. However, he left the chair in 1937 to become Vice-Chancellor of Liverpool University where he remained until 1945. when he returned to Cambridge to take up the position of professor of comparative law. He was offered the position of master of Caius, but declined it in favour of joining the International Court of Justice.

His interest was in the common law and he lectured on contract at Cambridge, though he was most notable as an international law expert. R. Y. Jennings said McNair was of the opinion that international lawyers must first become experts in private law in order to ensure legal actions are founded in "hard law" rather than speculation.

International court appointments
McNair was elected a judge of the International Court of Justice in The Hague in 1945, a post he held until 1955; he was also president of the Court from 1952 to 1955. He later served as the first President of the European Court of Human Rights at Strasbourg from 1959 to 1965.

Personal life
Lord McNair married Marjorie Bailhache (1887–1971), a social worker and daughter of Sir Clement Bailhache, in 1912. They had one son and three daughters. McNair's wife died in 1971 and he in 1975, aged 90. He was succeeded in the barony by his son, Clement John McNair.

Honours 
McNair was created a CBE in 1918 and knighted and made a King's Counsel in 1943. In 1955 he was raised to the peerage as Baron McNair, of Gleniffer in the County of Renfrew. He received an honorary DCL from Oxford and LLD from the University of Glasgow, University of Liverpool and University of Birmingham. He received an honorary DLitt from the University of Reading.

Notes

References

Remarks of Former ICJ President Stephen M. Schwebel during Discussion and Dinner at the 25th Anniversary Conference of the Lauterpacht Centre for International Law on 11-12 July 2008

External links 

International law scholars
McNair, Arnold Duncan McNair, 1st Baron
McNair, Arnold Duncan, 1st Baron
Presidents of the European Court of Human Rights
People educated at Aldenham School
McNair, Arnold Duncan McNair, 1st Baron
Members of Gray's Inn
McNair, Arnold Duncan McNair, 1st Baron
20th-century English judges
Commanders of the Order of the British Empire
Fellows of Gonville and Caius College, Cambridge
Fellows of the British Academy
Alumni of Gonville and Caius College, Cambridge
Vice-Chancellors of the University of Liverpool
Whewell Professors of International Law
British judges of United Nations courts and tribunals
British judges of international courts and tribunals
Hereditary barons created by Elizabeth II